Sidasodes is a genus of flowering plants belonging to the family Malvaceae.

Its native range is Western South America.

Species
Species:

Sidasodes colombiana 
Sidasodes jamesonii

References

Malveae
Malvaceae genera